KEHS may refer to:

 KEHS Malaysia Sdn. Bhd.
 Kennewick High School
 King Edward VI High School for Girls, Birmingham
 King Edward VI High School, Stafford
 Kenmore East High School